Multimedia Celebrity Poker is a 1995 poker video game developed and published by New World Computing.

Gameplay and concept
Multimedia Celebrity Poker is a simulation of the card game poker, in which the player competes with celebrities Joe Piscopo, Morgan Fairchild and Jonathan Frakes. The actors are presented via full-motion video.

Reception

Multimedia Celebrity Poker won a negative review from PC Gamer US, whose writer Michael Wolf called it "just a poker sim with a gimmick" that "wears off as quickly as the video starts repeating itself". Donald St. John of Electronic Entertainment found the game "not good at all". Computer Gaming Worlds Alan Emrich was more positive, writing, "As a purely entertaining experience, which is clearly what New World had in mind for this product, it succeeds, but with considerable limitations."

References

External links

1995 video games
Full motion video based games
Poker video games
Single-player video games
Video games based on real people
Video games developed in the United States
Windows games
Windows-only games